Santa Lucia – En klassisk jul is a Christmas album by Malena Ernman, released on 17 November 2010.

Track listing
Jul, jul, strålande jul
När det lider mot jul
Halleluja
Pie Jesu (Fauré)
Santa Lucia (with Charles Castronovo)
Laudamus Te
Stilla natt (Stille Nacht, heilige Nacht)
Laudate Dominum
Koppången
Eternal Source of Light Divine
Bred dina vida vingar
Pie Jesu (Webber)
Betlehems stjärna
Ave Maria (with Martin Fröst)
Marias vaggsång (Mariae Wiegenlied)
Den signade dag

Charts

Weekly charts

Year-end charts

References 

2010 Christmas albums
Christmas albums by Swedish artists
Malena Ernman albums